RU-56187 is a nonsteroidal antiandrogen which was never marketed. It shows 92% of the affinity of testosterone for the androgen receptor and negligible affinity for other steroid hormone receptors. The medication is a silent antagonist of the androgen receptor. RU-56187 is 3- to 10-fold more potent as an antiandrogen than bicalutamide or nilutamide in animals. Both RU-56187 and RU-58841 appear to be prodrugs of cyanonilutamide (RU-56279) in vivo in animals.

See also
 RU-57073
 RU-58642
 RU-59063

References

Abandoned drugs
Imidazolines
Ketones
Nitriles
Nonsteroidal antiandrogens
Organosulfur compounds
Prodrugs
Trifluoromethyl compounds